The Men's time trial of the 2013 UCI Road World Championships was a cycling event scheduled that take place on 25 September 2013 in the region of Tuscany, Italy.

The course of the race was 57.9 km from Montecatini Terme to the Nelson Mandela Forum in Florence. German rider Tony Martin was the defending champion and he retained his title.

Final classification

References

Men's time trial
UCI Road World Championships – Men's time trial
2013 in men's road cycling